Rory (Roderick) Brooks CBE  is a British businessman and philanthropist.

He graduated from the University of Manchester Institute of Science and Technology in 1975 and established the Rory and Elizabeth Brooks Foundation which funded the Brooks World Poverty Institute at the University of Manchester in 2005.

He co-founded the international private equity group MML Capital Partners in 1989. MML is a private equity firm specializing in direct and secondary direct investments.  It is the financial backer of Vanguard Healthcare.

He was a member of the British Government Task Force on Philanthropy in Higher Education and is a director of the Centre for Social Justice.  He is a regular donor to the Conservative Party.

He was appointed CBE in the 2015 Birthday Honours.

He lives in Notting Hill with his wife, Elizabeth, and two adult children.

References

www.brooks-foundation.org.uk

Living people
Commanders of the Order of the British Empire
Year of birth missing (living people)
Conservative Party (UK) donors